Cosmic music may refer to:
 Afro/Cosmic music, synthesizer-heavy and/or African-influenced dance music
 Krautrock, sometimes called "kosmische musick"
 Space music, a subgenre of new-age music

Cosmic Music may refer to:
 Cosmic Couriers, a German experimental/space-rock label
 Cosmic Music, a jazz album by John and Alice Coltrane
 Cosmic Music, a Pink Floyd bootleg recording
Cosmic Music, a 1989 book by Joscelyn Godwin

See also
 Space music (disambiguation)